Stephanus of Alexandria (fl. c. 580 – c. 640) was a Byzantine philosopher and teacher who, besides philosophy in the Neo-Platonic tradition, also wrote on alchemy, astrology and astronomy. He was one of the last exponents of the Alexandrian academic tradition before the Islamic conquest of Egypt.

Life
Stephanus studied at Alexandria, probably under Elias. He is often named alongside Elias and David as among the Christians of the school of Olympiodorus. According to John Moschus, he was teaching and writing commentaries in Alexandria in the 580s, where he was involved in the controversy over Monophysitism, apparently taking positions on both sides. John calls him a "sophist and philosopher".

Shortly after the accession of the Emperor Heraclius in 610, Stephanus moved to Constantinople, the capital of the empire, "thereby bridging late Alexandria and the medieval Byzantine world." Whether he was invited by the emperor is not known. He took up a position as "ecumenical professor" (oikoumenikos didaskalos) at the Imperial Academy teaching Plato, Aristotle, the quadrivium, alchemy and astrology. Among his students were the philosopher known as Pseudo-Elias and Tychicus of Trebizond, the teacher of the Armenian polymath Anania Shirakatsi.

Many works are attributed to Stephanus, some falsely, most written at Constantinople. Agapius of Hierapolis, writing of the treaty between Heraclius and the Persian king Kavad II in 628, states that Stephanus was "famous among the philosophers at that time". Stephanus died sometime before the death of Heraclius in 641. His identification with Stephanus of Athens has been proposed, but is unlikely.

Works 
1.  A commentary on Aristotle.  Editions:

 Commentaria in Aristotelem Graeca ed. consilio et auctoritate Academiae litt. reg. Boruss., Berlin, Bd. XV
 Ioannes Philoponus de anima, ed. Michael Hayduck, 1897 p. 446-607 (see praef. p. V); Vol. XVIII/3
 Stephanus de interpretatione, ed. M. Hayduck, 1885 (Vol. XXI/2: Stephanus in artem rhetoricam is by a Byzantine Rhetor Stephanos of the 12th century).

2. A commentary on the Isagogue of Porphyry.  Editions:

 Anton Baumstark, Aristot. b. den Syrern v. 5.-8. Jh., Vol. 1: Syr.-arab. Biographien des Aristot., syr. Kommentare z. Eisag.des Porph., Leipzig 1900, 181-210 (with a translation of the fragments of the commentary of Stephanos).

3. Astronomical and chronological works.  Editions:

 Explanatio per propria exempla commentarii Theonis in tabulas manuales, Ed. Usener, De Stephano Al. p. 38-54 (= Kl. Schriften. III, 295–319).

4. Alchemical works.  Scholars are divided as to whether or not these are authentic works of the same Stephen of Alexandria due to the style of writing. The translator, F. Sherwood Taylor accepts them as his. A compendium of alchemical texts including the poem De Chrysopoeia (On how to make gold) is extant in two manuscripts, Venice Cod. Marcianus 299 and Paris BNF 2327.

Editions:

 De magna et sacra arte, Ed. Julius Ludwig Ideler in Physici et medici Graeci minores II, Berlin 1842 (Reprinted Hakkert, Amsterdam 1963) p. 199-253.   (Ideler used a faulty copy of the Marcianus)
 F. Sherwood Taylor, The alchemical works of S. of Al., in: Ambix, the Journal of the Society for the study of alchemy and early chemistry 1, London 1937, 116–139; 2, 1938, 38-49   (Taylor compared Ideler with the Marcianus and edited lessons 1-3 only; with English translation and commentary).

5. Astrological works.

 Opusculum apotelesmaticum, Ed. Usener in De Stephano Al. p. 17-32 (= Kl. Schrr. III, 266–289).

6. A horoscope of Muhammad and a prophecy of the rise of Islam attributed to Stephanus is apocryphal. It must date from after 775, since it mentions the Caliph al-Mahdi.

Notes

References

Further reading 

Texts:

 Julius Ludwig Ideler, Physici et medici Graeci minores II, Berlin 1842 (Reprinted by Hakkert, Amsterdam 1963) p. 199-253. Greek text (only) in full online at Google books here
 F. Sherwood Taylor, "The Alchemical Works of Stephanos of Alexandria", in "Ambix" (1937).  Vol. 1, pp. 116–39 ; Vol 2, pp. 39–49.  Greek text and facing English translation of 3 of the 9 lectures of the work.

Dictionaries:

 Albert Ehrhard, Karl Krumbacher: Geschichte der byzantinischen Litteratur von Justinian bis zum Ende des Oströmischen Reiches, 2nd Ed. (1897). Vol. 2 at google books in full, pp. 480f, 614, 621 *, 625, 633.  (Vol.1 here).
 

Articles and studies:

 Hermann Usener, De Stephano Alexandrino Bonn (1880)
 Alb. Jahn, "Chemica graeca ex codicibus Monacensi 112 et Bernensi 579", Revue de Philologie 15 (1891) 101–115.  Short intro to his alchemical works.
 F. Sherwood Taylor, "The Origins of Greek Alchemy", Ambix, I, May 1937, pp. 30–47.
 Maria Papathanassiou, (1992), "Stephanos von Alexandreia und sein alchemistisches Werk", Ph.D. Thesis, Humboldt Universität zur Berlin, Berlín. 
 Maria Papathanassiou, (1990–1991) "Stephanus of Alexandria: Pharmaceutical notions and cosmology in his alchemical work", "Ambix", nº 37, pp. 121–133; nº 38, p. 112 [addenda].
 R. Werner Soukup, (1992), "Natur, du himmlische! Die alchemistischen Traktate des Stephanos von Alexandria. Eine Studie zur Alchemie des 7. Jahrhunderts", "Mitteilungen der Österreichischen Gesellschaft für Geschichte der Naturwissenschaften 12, 1992, 1-93
 Maria Papathanassiou, (1996), "Stephanus of Alexandria: On the structure and date of his alchemical work", in "Medicina nei Secoli 8", 2, pp. 247–266.
 Wanda Wolska-Conus, "Stéphanos d'Athènes et Stéphanos d'Alexandrie. Essai d'identitification et de biographie," Revue des Études Byzantines 47 (1989), p. 5-89.

7th-century philosophers
Commentators on Aristotle
Greek alchemists
7th-century Byzantine writers
7th-century astronomers
7th-century mathematicians
7th-century Byzantine scientists
Byzantine astronomers
7th-century alchemists